"Feel So Fine" is a song released in 1960 by Johnny Preston. The song is a reworking of the 1955 song "Feel So Good" by Shirley & Lee, with modified lyrics.

Shirley & Lee version
Shirley & Lee's "Feel So Good" reached No. 2 on Billboards Rhythm & Blues Records chart for "Most Played in Juke Boxes", No. 5 on Billboards Rhythm & Blues Records chart for "Best Sellers in Stores", No. 7 on Billboards Rhythm & Blues Records chart for "Most Played by Jockeys", and No. 6 on Cash Boxs Rhythm & Blues Top 15.

Johnny Preston version
Johnny Preston's version was released in 1960, and spent 14 weeks on the Billboard Hot 100 chart, peaking at No. 14, while reaching No. 9 on the Cash Box Top 100, No. 6 in Flanders, No. 9 in Australia, No. 14 on Canada's CHUM Hit Parade, No. 18 in the United Kingdom, and No. 26 in Wallonia.

Chart performance

Kenny Vernon version
Kenny Vernon released a version of "Feel So Fine" as a single in 1972 and on the album Loversville in 1973. Vernon's version reached No. 55 on Billboards Hot Country Singles chart.

References

1955 songs
1955 singles
1960 singles
Johnny Preston songs
Mercury Records singles